Macrobdella is a genus of leeches native to freshwater ecosystems of North America, especially Canada, Mexico, and the United States. The genus is commonly referred to as North American medicinal leeches.

Species 

 Macrobdella decora (Say, 1824)
 Macrobdella diplotertia Meyer, 1975
 Macrobdella ditetra Moore, 1953
 Macrobdella mimicus Phillips, Salas-Montiel, Kvist, Oceguera-Figueroa, 2019
 Macrobdella sestertia Whitman, 1886

References 

Leeches